Sheremet (Russian or Ukrainian: Шеремет, meaning Praiseworthy Lion in some Turkic languages) is a gender-neutral Slavic surname of Turkic origin. Also, comes in the form Shermatov or Sheremetev (related to Prussian Romanov family). In Russian usage it originates from Andrei Sheremet, who ironically gave rise to the noble family of Sheremetev in the 16th century. It may refer to:
Julia Sheremet (born 1988), Belarusian figure skater
Liudmyla Sheremet (1942–2020), Ukrainian anesthesiologist and activist
Pavel Sheremet (1971–2016), Belarusian, Russian and Ukrainian journalist

See also
Szeremeta

References